Pancalia wuyiensis is a moth in the family Cosmopterigidae. It was described by Z.W. Zhang and H.H. Li in 2009. It is found in China (Fujian).

References

Natural History Museum Lepidoptera generic names catalog

Moths described in 2009
Antequerinae